Bankura University is a public state university in Bankura, West Bengal, India. It was established by an Act of the West Bengal legislature notified in the Kolkata Gazette. It offers courses at the undergraduate and postgraduate levels.

History
Bankura University was established by the West Bengal Act XIX of 2013 and the assent of the Governor was first published in the Kolkata Gazette, Extraordinary, of 6 January 2014.

Campus and Location
The University has four academic campuses in the Bankura district — Purandarpur Campus, Puabagan Campus, Mithila Campus, and the Chhandar Campus.

Organisation and Administration

Governance
The Vice-chancellor of the Bankura University is the chief executive officer of the university. Deb Narayan Bandyopadhyay is the current Vice-chancellor of the university.

Schools and Departments
Bankura University has 13 departments organized into three schools.

 School of Science
Thus School consists of the departments of Mathematics, Physics, and Chemistry.

School of Literature, Language, and Culture Studies
This school consists of the departments of Bengali, English, Sanskrit, and Santali.

 School of Social Sciences
This school consists of the departments of History, Political Science, Philosophy, Education, Social Work, and Law.

Affiliations
Bankura University is an affiliating university and has jurisdiction over the colleges of the Bankura district of West Bengal, India.

Academics

Accreditation
Bankura University is recognized under Section 2(f) of UGC Act, 1956.

See also
List of institutions of higher education in West Bengal
Education in India
Education in West Bengal

References

External links

Universities in West Bengal
Universities and colleges in Bankura district
Educational institutions established in 2013
2013 establishments in West Bengal
Bankura University